Cardal is a town in the Florida Department of southern-central Uruguay.

Geography

History
The date when the populated centre was first created is uncertain, but it is generally taken to be at the time the train station was established here, in 1900. Its status was elevated to "Pueblo" (village) on 10 September 1937 by the Act of Ley Nº 9.688, and on 28 January 1985, to "Villa" (town) by the Act of Ley Nº 15.707. In the year 2000 a celebration was held for the 100 years of the town with a big party which lasted a whole week.

Population
In 2011 Cardal had a population of 1,202.
 
Source: Instituto Nacional de Estadística de Uruguay

Government Organization
A Junta Local is established in the town.

Economy
By national law, Cardal is the capital of the milk in Uruguay. Each year a celebration is held to commemorate this nomination. The area is surrounded by many milk farms, this being the principal economic activity. Many of the milk farms are nucleated in Grupo Cardal, a gremial group of milk farmers. Along the town there is also many shops and services. There are many groceries shops, a pharmacy, a petrol station, two bakery, many bars, two butchers, a tools trade, some unisex´s clothing store.

Health
There is a GP (General Practi) from the General Health Public Service (ASSE). Also a GP from the private health service COMEF is established at the town.
There are two doctors who live at the town.

Education
The town school was named "Italia", in their classrooms students from 4 to 12 years learning for their future. There is also a high school for teenagers from 12 to 16 years.

Sport
It has a sport and social club nominated 19 de Abril, a place of encounter for the inhabitants of the town and also it has a football team which participates in many championships along the department of Florida and the whole country.
Many children play football in a club nominated "Sureños", which has a good reputation as a club to meet children and create a good ambient for them apart from the school.

MEVIR
There are two MEVIR complex, something which has helped to bring homes to many people.

References

External links
INE map of Cardal

Populated places in the Florida Department